Interlaken-Oberhasli District in the Canton of Bern was created on 1 January 2010, uniting the former Interlaken and Oberhasli districts. It is part of the Oberland administrative region.

Mergers
 On 1 January 2014 the former municipality of Gadmen merged into the municipality of Innertkirchen.

References

Districts of the canton of Bern